Sarah Perreault (born September 17, 1962) is a former political figure in Quebec. She represented Chauveau in the Quebec National Assembly as a Liberal from 2003 to 2007.

She was born in Chicoutimi, Quebec, the daughter of Jean-Guy Perreault and Jacqueline Allard, and was educated at the Université Laval. She worked as an aide for John Crosbie in 1988 and 1989 and was a researcher for the Quebec Liberal Party from 1999 to 2002. She was elected in the 2003 Quebec election but defeated in 2007 and 2008.

References 
 

1962 births
Living people
Politicians from Saguenay, Quebec
Quebec Liberal Party MNAs
Women MNAs in Quebec
21st-century Canadian politicians
21st-century Canadian women politicians